Hay, Bahay! is a Philippine television situational comedy series broadcast by GMA Network. Directed by Bibeth Orteza, it stars Vic Sotto, Ai-Ai de las Alas, Oyo Boy Sotto, Jose Manalo, Wally Bayola and Kristine Hermosa. It premiered on June 19, 2016, on the network's Sunday Grande sa Gabi line up replacing Vampire ang Daddy Ko. The series concluded on August 27, 2017, with a total of 61 episodes. It was replaced by All-Star Videoke in its timeslot.

Premise
The sitcom revolves around a couple, Yoyo and Batch who lives in a crazy and fun house together with their boarders - Vio, Lav, Mael, and Sikat.

Cast and characters

Main cast
 Vic Sotto as Edilberto "Vio" Vargas
 Ai-Ai de las Alas as Lavinia "Lav" Rodrigo-Vargas
 Kristine Hermosa as Batch / Mrs. Y
 Oyo Boy Sotto as Yoyo / Mr. Y
 Jose Manalo as Mael
 Wally Bayola as Sikat Rodrigo

Recurring cast
 Marlann Flores as Bolina
 Jelson Bay as Clooney / Remy
 Ruby Rodriguez as Nenuca / Nidora
 Pilita Corrales as Amelia

Ratings
According to AGB Nielsen Philippines' Mega Manila household television ratings, the pilot episode of Hay, Bahay! earned a 17% rating. While the final episode scored an 8.8% rating in Nationwide Urban Television Audience Measurement People in television homes.

Accolades

References

External links
 

2016 Philippine television series debuts
2017 Philippine television series endings
Filipino-language television shows
GMA Network original programming
Philippine comedy television series
Philippine television sitcoms
Television series by M-Zet Productions
Television shows set in the Philippines